The 4th Air Wing is a wing of the Japan Air Self-Defense Force. It comes under the authority of Air Training Command. It is based at Matsushima Air Field in Iwate Prefecture.

It consists of two squadrons:
 21st Fighter Training Squadron (Mitsubishi F-2B)
 11th Squadron (Blue Impulse) (Kawasaki T-4)

References

Units of the Japan Air Self-Defense Force
1958 establishments in Japan